Chaque feu is a 1999 album of Canadian singer Roch Voisine.

It was released in 3 versions:
Canadian Version: 1 CD (containing 14 songs)
European Version: 1 CD (containing 14 songs)
Special Edition for Canada: 2 CD's (containing 14 songs and 6 bonus songs)

Track listing

Canadian Version of Chaque feu...

Je resterai là
Au bout de la piste
Juste pour soi
Doucement
La seconde chance
J'ai l'espoir
Un simple gars
Juste un peu de temps
Obia
Mourir les sirènes
Les lys blancs
Avant vous
Chaque feu
Et si…

European Version of Chaque feu...

Comme…
Je resterai là
Au bout de la piste
Juste pour soi
Doucement
La seconde chance
J'ai l'espoir
Un simple gars
Mourir les sirènes (new version)
Les lys blancs
Avant vous
Chaque feu
Obia
Et si…

Special Edition – Canada of Chaque feu...

Je resterai là
Au bout de la piste
Juste pour soi
Doucement
La seconde chance
J'ai l'espoir
Un simple gars
Juste un peu de temps
Obia
Mourir les sirènes
Les lys blancs
Avant vous
Chaque feu
Et si…

Bonus:
Comme
Par cœur
S'aimer sans lumière
Les amants
S'aimer
Comme j'ai toujours envie d'aimer

External links
Roch Voisine Official site "Canadian album version" page
Roch Voisine Official site "European album version" page
Roch Voisine Official site "Special Edition – Canada album version" page

1999 greatest hits albums
Roch Voisine albums